Stena Danica may refer to:

MV Lucy Maude Montgomery, car ferry built 1965, previously Stena Danica, later Lady Clare I
MV Queen of the North, car ferry built 1969, previously Stena Danica
MS Stena Danica, car ferry built in 1983